Jennifer Ann Zimdahl Galt (born 1959) is a U.S. diplomat currently serving as the Foreign Policy Advisor to the United States Indo-Pacific Command. Galt was the United States Ambassador to Mongolia from 2015 to 2017.

On May 6, 2015, President Barack Obama nominated Jennifer Zimdahl Galt to be Ambassador of the United States of America to Mongolia. She was confirmed by the Senate on August 5, 2015, and was sworn in on September 15, 2015.

Ambassador Galt, a career member of the Senior Foreign Service, formerly served as Principal Officer of the U.S. Consulate General, Guangzhou, China, where she led and mentored a team of nearly 500, comprising 133 American officers, of whom 62 were first- and second-tour, and over 300 locally engaged Chinese colleagues.

Ambassador Galt's previous postings overseas have included Belgrade, Taipei with the American Institute in Taiwan, Consulate General in Mumbai, Embassy in Beijing, Consulate General in Shanghai, and the U.S. Mission to the North Atlantic Treaty Organization (NATO) in Brussels. In Washington, Ambassador Galt served as Senior Advisor in the United States Department of State’s Bureau of Public Affairs and as Deputy Director for Public Diplomacy in the Bureau of East Asian and Pacific Affairs.

Ambassador Galt holds master's degrees from National Defense University and from the Johns Hopkins University School of Advanced International Studies (SAIS), as well as a bachelor's degree in political science, history and languages from Colorado College in her home state of Colorado. She is fluent in Mandarin and French, and also speaks Italian, Spanish and Serbian.
She has two children, Phoebe and Dylan Galt and a husband, Fritz Galt.

See also

List of ambassadors of the United States

References

External links

1959 births
Living people
Ambassadors of the United States to Mongolia
American women ambassadors
Assistant Secretaries of State for Education and Culture
Paul H. Nitze School of Advanced International Studies alumni
National Defense University alumni
Colorado College alumni
People of the American Institute in Taiwan
United States Foreign Service personnel
Consuls general of the United States in Guangzhou
21st-century American women
American diplomats
American women diplomats